Melita Lake, known to the Nisga'a as T’aam Baxhl Mihl, is a shallow lake located in Nisga'a Memorial Lava Bed Provincial Park, northwestern British Columbia, Canada. Its primary inflow and outflow is Crater Creek, which flows west into the Tseax River.

Melita Lake consists of two segments that are informally called Upper Melita Lake and Lower Melita Lake. They are separated by a series of small and heavily vegetated islands that form part of a lava flow. The deepest part of Melita Lake measures approximately  near its western shores, although its central and northeast shores also contain two deep spots.

Melita Lake formed after Crater Creek was dammed by lava from an eruption of Tseax Cone about 250 years ago. Exposed along the western and northern shores of Melita Lake are a series of collapsed lava blocks and agglutinated tree logs.

References

External links

Lakes of British Columbia
Hazelton Mountains
Lava dammed lakes
Cassiar Land District